U.S. Route 35 (US 35) is a United States Highway that runs southeast-northwest for approximately  from the western suburbs of Charleston, West Virginia to northern Indiana. Although the highway is physically southeast-northwest, it is nominally north–south. The highway's southern terminus is in Teays Valley, West Virginia, near Scott Depot, at Interstate 64 (I-64). Its northern terminus is near Michigan City, Indiana, at US 20. The West Virginia portion of the highway is mostly expressway, becoming a freeway shortly before it crosses the Ohio River into Ohio. The Ohio portion has been upgraded to a four-lane highway/freeway between the West Virginia state line and Trotwood, west of Dayton.

Route description
US 35 is signed north-south in West Virginia and Indiana, while in Ohio it is signed east-west.

West Virginia

As of November 11, 2021, the final West Virginia portion of the highway has been expanded to four lanes, mostly along a completely new route.

In Putnam County, the roadway that becomes US 35 is a short, four-lane, divided, unsigned US 35 spur running northward from Teays Valley Road toward I-64 on the edge of Scott Depot in Teays Valley. Remaining on the edge of Scott Depot, and now at the edge of Teays Valley, the roadway reaches US 35's southern terminus at its junction with I-64, where the route becomes an expressway.

US 35's junction with I-64 is a hybrid semi-directional T/diamond interchange. All movements between US 35 and I-64 are free-flowing, except for eastbound I-64 to northbound US 35. The interchange also handles movements between I-64 and the US 35 spur similar to a diamond interchange.

Proceeding north from I-64, US 35 has two intersections, followed by an interchange with West Virginia Route 34 (WV 34). There follow a number of intersections along the route, with one being an indirect connection to WV 817, the former path of US 35.  The next major junction is WV 869, which travels across the Kanawha River on the Lower Buffalo Bridge (often referred to as the "Buffalo Bridge"), connecting via WV 62 to the town of Buffalo and the nearby, large Toyota engine and transmission plant.  The route continues as an expressway.

At WV 2, which leads to Point Pleasant, there is a partial cloverleaf interchange with six ramps; all movements are free-flowing except for northbound US 35 to southbound WV 2, and from southbound WV 2 to southbound US 35; the interchange is partially in Henderson. At this point, US 35 becomes a freeway and remains so, as it immediately crosses the Ohio River on the Silver Memorial Bridge, and enters Ohio.

Ohio
US 35 is signed east-west in Ohio, an exception to the numbering scheme for US Highways, which calls for odd-numbered routes to be signed north-south, as is US 35 in West Virginia and Indiana.

Continuing as a freeway, US 35 crosses the Ohio River from West Virginia on the Silver Memorial Bridge, and enters Gallia County, Ohio. The first, partial interchange, providing a westbound exit and an eastbound entrance, is with State Route 7 (SR 7), just outside the village of Gallipolis. Just after that, still, outside the village, the highway passes adjacent to the Gallia–Meigs Regional Airport within Gallipolis; there is another partial interchange, providing an eastbound left exit and a westbound left entrance to SR 735, which connects to SR 7.

From there, US 35 continues west, where there is a hybrid interchange with an unusual configuration at SR 160. SR 160 roughly parallels US 35 to the south; there is a westbound exit to SR 160 north which uses a flyunder ramp, an eastbound entrance from SR 160 south, and an eastbound entrance from SR 160 north. Additionally, another fly under ramp from SR 160 north merges with the westbound exit ramp; that exit ramp, in turn, splits to form an entrance ramp to westbound US 35. This interchange lacks an eastbound exit. As SR 160 turns north, it diverges from US 35, which travels somewhat northwest. There, US 35 once again meets SR 160, this time at a partial interchange with an eastbound exit and a westbound loop ramp entrance.

Turning more west-northwest, there is an interchange at SR 850 (Rodney Pike), followed by a rest area in each direction. Approaching the edge of Rio Grande, the route turns west and then west-southwest, where there is an interchange at SR 325.

Past the village, the highway travels northwest and becomes a four-lane, at-grade expressway when it reaches the Gallia County village of Centerville; here there is an intersection with SR 279 west.

Traveling north-northwest and northwest into Jackson County, the expressway configuration continues until SR 327, where there is a grade-separated, one-quadrant interchange, with the connecting road in the southeast quadrant of the junction. The road resumes as an at-grade expressway, approaching and then skirting the edge of Jackson.

The route then reaches a grade-separated, right-in/right-out interchange; westbound there is a right-in/right-out at Keystone Furnace Road; eastbound there is a right-in/right-out at McCarty Lane; these roads are connected via Industry Drive and Acy Avenue, which overpasses US 35.

Next, there is an unusual interchange configuration at SR 32/SR 124, which is an expressway in both directions. Each highway has ramps that exit to the other highway, with  traffic merging onto the second highway, but  traffic coming to an  intersection. Both highways end up having  intersections, albeit with grade separation of the main highway corridors. This interchange type is sometimes termed a "windmill" interchange, but it is not related to the interchange type of the same name. This junction is the only interchange of its type known to exist in the world.

Soon after passing the last interchange and still skirting Jackson, the highway once again becomes a freeway and has an interchange at Pattonsville Road/Broadway Street. Turning briefly north, then northwest, the route leaves Jackson and reaches an interchange with SR 93. It next has an interchange with Jackson County Road 84 (Chillicothe Pike).

Along this section, there is a rest area next to the westbound lanes but accessible from both directions, with additional access via Cain Road (Jackson Township Road 213).

US 35 then turns roughly west, entering Ross County and reaching an interchange with Vigo Road/Watson Road at Richmond Dale. At this point the route again becomes a freeway. Turning north and northwest, the section between Richmond Dale and Chillicothe includes a large cut through a  ridge and provides westbound motorists with a panoramic view of the Scioto River valley.

Next, US 50 west leaves the concurrency at a partial interchange at Eastern Avenue; there is only a westbound exit and an eastbound entrance. Then, the US 23 north freeway joins US 35 in a concurrency at a partial-Y interchange; there is an eastbound exit and a westbound left entrance.

Turning north-northwest, US 35 skirts Chillicothe to the east, coming to an interchange at Main Street. Turning northwest, the US 23 north freeway leaves the concurrency at a partial-Y interchange; there is a westbound exit and an eastbound left entrance.

Turning west and skirting through city boundaries, there is a partial cloverleaf interchange with five ramps at SR 159 (Bridge Street); there is a loop ramp from northbound Bridge Street and a directional ramp from southbound Bridge Street to westbound US 35. Travelers eastbound near this interchange can see the hills that are shown on the Great Seal of the State of Ohio.

Turning northwest, just outside the city limits, there is an interchange at SR 104 (High Street). The next, partial interchange, is at Pleasant Valley Road/Egypt Pike with a westbound exit and an eastbound entrance (via Larrick Lane). Continuing along, there is an interchange at Ross County Road 550/Pleasant Valley; despite this junction being a regular service interchange, it is configured as a hybrid trumpet interchange. Next is an interchange at Ross County Road 87, near Frankfort. Continuing, there is an interchange at SR 138.

Entering Fayette County, the road turns west-northwest, bypassing south of Washington Court House. The next major junction is with I-71 near Jeffersonville; rather than have a direct interchange, each freeway indirectly connects to the other via interchanges with SR 435.

As the route continues through flat farmlands, it enters Greene County, bypasses north of Jamestown and south of Xenia. 

Past the Xenia bypass, the road reverts to an at-grade expressway. As of November 2021, the traffic pattern has been officially switched to the U.S. 35 Superstreet at both intersections of Orchard Lane and Factory Road in Beavercreek, according to the Ohio Department of Transportation.

US 35 once again returns to freeway status at the North Fairfield Road interchange in Beavercreek. It next has a full-access interchange with I-675, also in Beavercreek.

Several miles later, in Montgomery County, the road opens into a three-lane highway (with five lanes in some parts) each way through downtown Dayton. Turning west, the highway has a full-access interchange with I-75 in downtown Dayton. Past I-75, the route becomes an expressway, with a mix of interchanges and at-grade intersections.

After entering Drexel, just west of Dayton, the highway turns north. At the border with Trotwood, the route turns due west on West Third Street/Eaton Pike; the roadway that had carried US 35 continues as an at-grade expressway SR 49 (the "Northwest Connector" or the "Trotwood Connector"). The roadway carrying US 35, now two lanes and undivided, travels through New Lebanon as Main Street.

US 35 then enters Preble County and travels through West Alexandria as Dayton Street. The route next proceeds to Eaton; after passing through downtown as Main Street, the route turns northwest onto Eaton Richmond Pike (Main Street continues as SR 122). The highway travels toward I-70 near New Paris, widens to four lanes as it approaches SR 320, turns north and briefly becomes four lanes undivided, then reduces to single-lane ramps and merges with the Interstate at a partial interchange.

Indiana
US 35 enters Wayne County, Indiana with I-70 and passes north of Richmond, before splitting off on the northwest side of Richmond. US 35 then travels in a northwesterly path as a winding two-lane highway, passing through agricultural land, and through intersections with State Road 38 (SR 38), SR 1 and, in Randolph County, US 36. The highway then passes through a corner of Henry County, with no major junctions.

In Delaware County, the highway reaches the edge of the city of Muncie, where it merges with SR 3 and SR 67 as a four-lane expressway. The expressway heads north, skirting the east side of Muncie, passing over the White River and through interchanges with Memorial Drive in unincorporated Center Township and SR 32 in Muncie. Continuing along the east edge of Muncie, there is a right-in/right-out intersection in both directions with East Centennial Avenue and an intersection with East McGalliard Road. Northeast of Muncie, at the border of unincorporated Center Township and Hamilton Township, there is an intersection with East Riggin Road. Shortly thereafter, SR 67 splits off the expressway at an interchange, followed by a partial interchange with Old State Road 3, leading back into Muncie. Soon after the expressway ends, with the roadway becoming a two-lane highway.

Near the town of Royerton, US 35 turns west onto SR 28, toward I-69, as SR 3 continues north. After a short overlap with SR 28, US 35 turns north onto I-69.

US 35 overlaps I-69, passing into Grant County, through an interchange with SR 26, to SR 22, where US 35 leaves I-69 and heads west on SR 22 to travel through the cities of Gas City and, in Howard County, Greentown. Just east of Kokomo, US 35 turns north onto the US 31 freeway. It overlaps US 31 for only , to a partial interchange where it splits off, heading west as a two-lane roadway. US 35 passes just north of a Chrysler manufacturing plant before an intersection with SR 931, the former route of US 31. The roadway briefly widens to a four-lane divided highway at a partial interchange with Davis Road, which connects from Kokomo. US 35 leaves the Kokomo area heading northwest into Cass County, toward Logansport.

As US 35 nears Logansport, the roadway becomes a four-lane expressway, just prior to its intersection with US 24. The expressway bypasses Logansport to the south as part of the Hoosier Heartland Highway. There is a northbound (westbound) exit to Monticello Road, the former routing of these highways. Northbound US 35 and westbound US 24 exit the Hoosier Heartland Highway at a split diamond interchange and run concurrently along the interchange's westbound  frontage road, having a very short overlap with SR 25 (southbound US 35 and eastbound US 24 run concurrently along the eastbound  frontage road, also overlapping SR 25). US 35 and US 24 then turn northwest from the frontage road onto another expressway on the west edge of Logansport. Along the roadway, there is an intersection with the aforementioned Monticello Road and a two-quadrant interchange with Old State Road 25. After crossing the Wabash River, the overlapped routes have a final interchange where US 24 exits heading due west, while US 35 continues north-northwest.

Soon after US 24 leaves US 35, US 35 narrows back to a two-lane road and travels through the town of Winamac, in Pulaski County. Once in Starke County, the route travels through the town of Knox. In Davis Township, near Hamlet, the US 30 expressway provides an interchange. After entering LaPorte County, US 35 travels to the community of South Center in Union Township; there it turns west on US 6 (the US 35 roadway continues north as South County Road 300 E). The route next turns north-northwest until it leaves the concurrency with US 6 northward in Washington Township, near Kingsbury. Turning northwest, US 35 travels through the city of La Porte; in northwestern La Porte, an intersection with SR 39 provides access to the Indiana Toll Road/I-80/I-90. US 35 next crosses under the Indiana Toll Road with no direct interchange access, in unincorporated Center Township. Farther northwest, US 35 has its northern terminus where it meets US 20 in Springfield Township, just east of an interchange with I-94, near Michigan City.

Logansport issues
Logansport area residents, the sheriff's department and at least one transportation expert have voiced concerns about the split diamond interchange used on the Logansport section of the Hoosier Heartland Highway. From the interchange's opening in October 2013 through February 28, 2016, there had been 71 two-vehicle crashes at or near the interchange, 53 of those at the interchange's four intersections, two fatalities, and a number of injuries. Possible causes for the accidents include drivers' unfamiliarity with this type of interchange, which is typically built in cities, and is not common in semi-rural small towns; drivers' mistaking the frontage roads for entrance ramps and not stopping when required; the complexity of four major traffic routes converging on one interchange; ramp/frontage traffic controlled by stop signs alone, with cross-traffic not having to stop; stop signs not clearly visible at the crest of the exit ramps. In response, the Indiana Department of Transportation (INDOT) 2014 added signage, placed flashing lights on the stop signs, and installed rumble strips. These steps reduced, but did not eliminate the problems, with one of the fatalities taking place after these fixes. INDOT was planning by spring 2016 to add overhead flashers, move the stop signs to more visible positions, install channelizing islands and increase overhead intersection lighting.

History

West Virginia
Originally, US 35 was routed from Charleston, West Virginia, on the north side of the Kanawha River (the current WV 62) to Point Pleasant until the collapse of the Silver Bridge in 1967. When the new Silver Memorial Bridge was completed in 1969, US 35 was moved to the south side of the river (the former WV 17) away from Point Pleasant, and its southern terminus was in St. Albans, West Virginia, at the junction of US 60.

Before funding was made available to convert US 35 to an expressway, a possibility had been put forward that the route would have been completed as a toll road.

On that date, the old segment of US 35 between US 60 and the Lower Buffalo Bridge was signed as WV 817.

Prior to July 2011, the expressway segment of US 35 between Beech Hill, near the junction with WV 817 north, and near Henderson was completed, tying into some older expressway segments in the Henderson area and crossing the Silver Memorial Bridge.

The remaining  section of two-lane roadway from about  before the Lower Buffalo Bridge to Beech Hill, near the junction with WV 817 north, was completed and opened to traffic on November 11, 2021.  This section had a $174 million contract awarded on June 2, 2015 for its completion. The section was tentatively to have been completed by fall of 2019, but the West Virginia Department of Transportation originally extended the completion date to August 2021, but then that was delayed to November 11, 2021.  The speed limit for all of US 35 within West Virginia is 65 mph.

Ohio
Before the adoption of the U.S. Highway System in 1926, the route in Ohio was known in its entirety as SR 11. By 1966, the first freeway portion of the route began construction, comprising the Chillicothe bypass. 

Freeway portions on the east side of Dayton and south side of Xenia were completed by 1971, and around Washington Court House by 1974. 

Before 1988, westbound traffic on US 35 west of I-75 in Dayton turned north along Williams Street, then was routed along West Third Street (eastbound traffic on West Third Street turned south on Broadway Street back to US 35); on October 25, 1996, a new expressway alignment through west Dayton, known as the "US 35 West" project, was completed. This portion of the route in Dayton west of I-75 is designated the "C. J. McLin Jr. Parkway", in honor of the late state representative who advocated for and worked toward the construction of "US 35 West".

The portion of US 35 from Drexel to SR 320 is the only two-lane, an undivided section of the route remaining in Ohio. US 35 is a major Appalachian Development Highway System Corridor linking I-70 and points west to I-64 and points east.

The portion of the route within Gallia County is designated the "Bob Evans Highway", in honor of the restaurateur and pork sausage marketer who spent most of his life in the county.

The portion of the route between Gallipolis and Jackson is designated as part of the Welsh Scenic Byway by the Ohio Department of Transportation, celebrating Welsh immigrants who settled in southeastern Ohio during the 19th century.

The interchange at North Fairfield Road in Beavercreek opened on October 25, 2003. As part of the project, the existing ramp from State Route 835 (Research Boulevard) to westbound US 35 was removed, with the area converted to wetlands, and part of the pavement used as a connection to a regional rail trail.

The section between Richmond Dale and Chillicothe was upgraded to a freeway in 2005.

On August 26, 2015, the at-grade intersection with Keystone Furnace Road and McCarty Lane at the Jackson–Lick Township line was converted into a right-in/right-out interchange.

In Beavercreek as of November 2021, the traffic pattern has been officially switched to the U.S. 35 Superstreet at both intersections of Orchard Lane and Factory Road, according to the Ohio Department of Transportation.

Indiana
The first signed road along the what would later become US 35 was SR 35, which ran from west of Jonesboro and Kokomo, and SR 15 from Burlington to Michigan City. In 1926 state road numbers were changed; SR 35 became SR 18 and SR 15 became SR 29. Many changes took place in 1930 along what would later become US 35, the first of which was a state road proposed between SR 38, near Richmond, and Muncie. This was followed by SR 21 being added to the state road system between Muncie and St. Anthony, and a state road being proposed between St. Anthony and SR 9 west of Jonesboro. The last change in 1930 was a proposed state road between Kokomo and Burlington.

Between late 1930 and early 1932 SR 21 was added to the state road system between SR 38 and Muncie and between St. Anthony and Jonesboro. At the same time SR 18 became SR 22 and was extended east through Jonesboro and west to Burlington. Also during this time frame a state road was proposed between Kokomo and Logansport. In late 1932 or early 1933 SR 21 was paved between Richmond and Muncie and SR 22 was paved between Kokomo and Burlington.

US 35 was first designated in the state of Indiana in 1935, US 35 was routed from the Ohio state line, near Richmond, to Michigan City, via Muncie, Kokomo, Burlington and Logansport, along SR 21, SR 22 and SR 29. At this time the Indiana State Highway Commission authorized the addition of SR 17 between Kokomo and Logansport. The construction on the authorized segment of SR 17 began between 1939 and 1941, with the construction being completed by 1942. US 35 was rerouted away from Kingsbury between 1942 and 1945, with the old route through the town becoming SR 829.

The multi-lane road of US 35 from US 6 to La Porte opened either in 1951 or 1952. The US 35 designation was rerouted onto SR 3 and SR 28 between Munice and St. Anthony between 1956 and 1957. The old route of US 35 became locally maintained roads and streets. The bypass of Jonesboro was completed in either 1965 or 1966, and US 35 was routed along it from SR 15 to the west; east of SR 15 was signed as only SR 22. In 1967 or 1968 US 35 was rerouted onto SR 28, I-69, and SR 22 from St. Anthony to Jonesboro. The old route of US 35 became county roads or city streets.

By 1970 US 35 was rerouted onto US 31 (now SR 931) to bypass downtown Kokomo. US 35 was rerouted onto SR 3 to bypass downtown Muncie between 1972 and 1973. By 1974 US 35 was rerouted away from downtown Logansport on the a bypass around the south and east sides of the city. The US 35 designation in Richmond was moved onto I-70 between 1997 and 1999.

In October 2008 the Indiana Department of Transportation and the City of Michigan City came to an agreement for the city to assume maintenance of the segment of US 35 from the US 20/SR 212 interchange to US 12. The city did so in October 2009, and the former segment of US 35 became known as Michigan Boulevard. INDOT submitted an application in October 2008 to the American Association of State Highway and Transportation Officials (AASHTO) to extend the decommissioning of US 35 to include the entire portion of the roadway from the east junction with US 20, through the US 20/SR 212 interchange, to US 12. INDOT still had signage, however, that indicated US 35 overlapped US 20 to the US 20/SR 212 interchange, which was not corrected until 2019.

New bypass roads in Kokomo and Logansport opened in 2013 and US 35 was rerouted along both new roadways.

Major junctions

Related routes

West Virginia spur route

U.S. Route 35 Spur (US 35 Spur) is the unsigned continuation of US 35 past its southern end at I-64.

Xenia business route

Jackson business route

The route runs from US 35 at the Chillicothe Pike exit to US 35 at the SR 32/SR 124 exit.

See also

Notes

References

External links

 Endpoints of U.S. Highway 35
 Indiana Highway Ends: US 35

 
35
35
35
35
Transportation in Putnam County, West Virginia
Transportation in Mason County, West Virginia
Transportation in Gallia County, Ohio
Transportation in Jackson County, Ohio
Transportation in Ross County, Ohio
Transportation in Fayette County, Ohio
Transportation in Greene County, Ohio
Transportation in Montgomery County, Ohio
Transportation in Preble County, Ohio
Transportation in Wayne County, Indiana
Transportation in Randolph County, Indiana
Transportation in Henry County, Indiana
Transportation in Delaware County, Indiana
Transportation in Grant County, Indiana
Transportation in Howard County, Indiana
Transportation in Cass County, Indiana
Transportation in Pulaski County, Indiana
Transportation in Starke County, Indiana
Transportation in LaPorte County, Indiana